Hypocrita glauca is a moth of the family Erebidae. It was described by Pieter Cramer in 1777. It is found in Suriname, Colombia, Brazil and Peru.

References

 

Hypocrita
Moths described in 1777